Pinhook Bog is a unique bog in Indiana that has been designated a National Natural Landmark. It is part of Indiana Dunes National Park, an area that many citizens, scientists, and politicians fought hard to preserve. Its sister bog, Volo Bog, is located nearby. The bog contains a large variety of plants, including insect eating plants, tamarack trees, stands of blueberry bushes, and floating mats of sphagnum moss. A "moat" separates the bog from the uplands.

Geology
The bog is a glacial kettle.  At the end of the Wisconsin Glacial epoch about 14,000 to 15,000 years ago, a large chunk of ice remained buried at this location as the ice retreated northward.  When the ice melted, the clay soil sealed the basins.

Precipitation and runoff from higher ground around the bog are the only water sources. There is no stream or groundwater inflow or outflow. Evaporation from the open water and plants is the only loss of moisture. A bog differs from swamps, marshes, and ponds because of this limited exchange of water.  The water in the bog is stagnant, acidic, and nutrient-poor.

Plants

The outstanding feature of Pinhook Bog is the tree-covered mat of sphagnum moss. Sphagnum moss is a stringy, delicate moss of a light-green color. As the mat thickens, larger and larger plants take root and grow. Under the mat a peat bed develops. The acidic water slows the decay of the sphagnum moss and other plants. With time, the peat may fill the bog from the mat to the bottom. As the moisture becomes less acidic, typical land plants take root and the bog disappears.

Orchids: 
Pink lady's slipper, stemless lady's-slipper, or moccasin flower (Cypripedium acaule) is pink, deep rose, to white color flower. It is the only lady's slipper with no stem leaves.
The flowers can be yellow to orange.
Rose pogonia or snake mouth orchid (Pogonia ophioglossoides) is a small pink orchid found in the bog near the end of the boardwalk.

Carnivorous plants:

Spoonleaf sundew (Drosera intermedia) is a tiny plant with spoon/teardrop shaped leaves covered in mucilage-tipped tentacles.
Round-leaved sundew (Drosera rotundifolia) is a tiny plant with rounded leaves covered in mucilage-tipped tentacles.
Purple pitcher plant (Sarracenia purpurea) has heavily-veined reddish or purple leaves in the strong sunlight that are folded to form a pitcher or cup, which is normally about half full of liquid containing digestive juices.
Horned bladderwort (Utricularia cornuta)  is a small terrestrial carnivorous plant that possesses bladder-shaped traps that feed on small soil insects. It usually goes unnoticed by rangers and visitors because its leaves are so small and instead is recognized by its flower.
Hidden-fruited bladderwort (Utricularia geminiscapa) is a small aquatic carnivorous plant that possesses bladder-shaped traps that feed on small aquatic insects.

Poison sumac is prevalent in the bog area, particularly around the outer edge, the '"moat".  It is recognized by its compound leaves of seven to thirteen leaflets. The leaflets have smooth edges and are pointed.

Tamarack or American larch is an unusual tree for northwest Indiana. It is a conifer, but not an evergreen.  It drops its leaves in the winter. As fall approaches, the needles turn golden until they fall off.

Blueberry and cranberry shrubs are common along the margins. Rusty cotton grass farther down the trail flourishes.

Access
The Pinhook Bog is open for specially scheduled ranger-guided tours and for infrequent open houses. Starting at the parking lot off Wozniak Road, a leisurely trail of about  leads through the woods to the entrance to the bog, which is gated and locked during non-tour hours.

See also

 Cowles Bog National Natural Landmark at Indiana Dunes National Park
 Indiana Dunes State Park, where the National Natural Landmark Dunes Nature Preserve is located
 Kettle (landform)

References

Bibliography
Daniel, Glenda; Dune Country, A Hiker's Guide to the Indiana Dunes; Illustrated by Carol Lerner; Swallow Press; Chicago, Illinois; 1984
Greenberg, Joel; A Natural History of the Chicago Region; University of Chicago Press; Chicago, Illinois; 2004

Bogs of Indiana
Indiana Dunes National Park
Protected areas of LaPorte County, Indiana
National Natural Landmarks in Indiana
Nature reserves in Indiana
Glacial landforms
Protected areas established in 1966
Landforms of LaPorte County, Indiana